Myotis septentrionalis, known as the northern long-eared bat or northern myotis, is a species of bat native to North America. There are no recognized subspecies. The northern long-eared bat is about 3–3.7 inches in length, with a wingspan of 9–10 inches. It is distinguishable by its long ears when comparing it to other bats in its genus. This species is commonly found in the northern United States and Southern Canada east of British Columbia. The geographic range includes 37 states.

Description
The fur and wing membranes are light brown in color, and the bat lacks the dark shoulder spots found in the closely related, and otherwise similar Keen's myotis (Myotis keenii). Compared to other Myotis species, these bats have long ears with a relatively long, pointed tragus; when folded forwards the ears extend well past the nose. They also have a longer tail and larger wing area than most comparably sized Myotis bats, giving them increased maneuverability during slow flight.

Distribution and habitat
Northern long-eared bats are found through much of the eastern half of the United States and Canada from Manitoba and Newfoundland in the north to North Carolina and Alabama in the south. They are also rarely found in western parts of Canada, sometimes as far as the western borders of British Columbia and Yukon. They are found primarily in forested habitats, especially boreal forests, as they typically roost in hardwood trees during the summer.

Biology and behavior

During the spring and summer, northern long-eared bats spend the day roosting in trees or artificial structures, switching to a new roost every other day on average. Males and non-reproductive females roost singly or in small groups, but reproductive females and their young form much larger maternity colonies, with up to sixty individuals.

In the fall, northern long-eared bats migrate to caves to hibernate. Depending on the latitude, this may occur at any time between September and November, and the bats emerge between March and May. They typically hibernate together with much larger numbers of bats of other species, although hibernating groups of northern long-eared bats may still number in the hundreds.

Northern long-eared bats are well-suited to foraging in the forest interior. Their echolocation calls have a classic frequency-modulated structure that allows these bats to navigate through cluttered environments, although they are shorter, quieter, and higher pitch (126 to 60 kHz) than those of other Myotis bats. Their diets are focused on moths, although they also eat beetles, flies, and other insects. Unusually, they capture these by gleaning, or plucking, the insects from a surface, rather than capturing them in flight. They forage under the forest canopy or in spaces at the edge of forests, and most foraging occurs in the first two hours after sunset.

Mating occurs between July and early October, although the females probably store the sperm over the winter, and only become pregnant in the spring. The young are born between May and early July, depending on latitude, and are typically fully grown by the end of August. They have been recorded to live for over eighteen years in the wild.

Conservation
The northern long-eared bat is predominantly threatened by white-nose syndrome, especially in the northeast portion of its range where the population has decreased by 99%. Due to white-nose syndrome the northern long-eared bat is considered federally Threatened by the United States Fish and Wildlife Service (USFWS) under section 4(d) of the Endangered Species Act. An oversight field hearing was held before the United States House Committee on Natural Resources in September 2014. A final decision was published in the Federal Register, listing the species as Threatened effective 30 days from the date of the publication (starting May 4, 2015). NatureServe considers the bat to be Imperiled.

The Elroy-Sparta Bike Trail tunnels in West Central Wisconsin are closed for the season by the beginning of November, using the doors that the railroad added to prevent storm damage. The debate on when to close the tunnel caused a conflict between the USFWS and the organizers of the Rails to Trails Marathon. The northern long-eared bat hibernates in Tunnel Number three. The Rails to Trails Marathon, a Boston Marathon qualifier, moved their event date to earlier in October from November in 2017 to accommodate an earlier tunnel closing than the original November 15 date.

On November 29, 2022, the species was listed as endangered by the U.S. Fish and Wildlife Service via a statement from director Martha Williams.

References

Mouse-eared bats
Bats of Canada
Bats of the United States
ESA threatened species
Mammals described in 1897
Taxa named by Édouard Louis Trouessart